Charles Auffray (born 24 February 1973) is a former professional tennis player from France.

Auffray made the second round of the 1998 Grand Prix Hassan II tournament in Casablanca, defeating German Jens Knippschild. It would be the only match he won on the ATP Tour.

He faced reigning champion Gustavo Kuerten at the 1998 French Open and lost in straight sets.

References

1973 births
Living people
French male tennis players
Place of birth missing (living people)